Niederhaslach is a commune in the Bas-Rhin department in Grand Est in north-eastern France.

It is noteworthy for its Gothic 13th-15th century Niederhaslach Church.

See also
 Oberhaslach, a neighbouring commune
 Communes of the Bas-Rhin department

References

Communes of Bas-Rhin
Bas-Rhin communes articles needing translation from French Wikipedia